Jangorzo FC is a Nigerien football club based in Maradi. Their home games are played at Stade de Maradi.

Achievements
Niger Premier League: 1
 1983

Niger Cup: 1
 1983

Football clubs in Niger
Super Ligue (Niger) clubs
Maradi, Niger